This stone inscription inscribed in Saka 1660 (1738 AD), records the construction of the Southern Gateway of the Barphukan's Office (Durbar) at the supervision of Tarun Duara Borphukan under the command of Siva Singha. 

The inscription was originally on the southern gate of the Barphukan's Office, from where now it is currently preserved at Assam State Museum.

Notes

References 

Monumental columns in India
Indian inscriptions
India
 
Sculptures in India
Indian architectural history
Outdoor sculptures in India
Archaeological artifacts of India
History of Assam
Assam
 
Assamese inscriptions